Josef Metternich (2 June 1915, in Cologne – 21 February 2005, in Feldafing) was a German operatic baritone.

Metternich also appeared at the Royal Opera House in London, La Scala in Milan, and made his debut at the Metropolitan Opera in New York, in La forza del destino, in 1953.

He joined the Munich State Opera in 1954, where he created the role of Johannes Kepler in Hindemith's Die Harmonie der Welt (1957).

Metternich was a powerful singer and charismatic performer. He retired in 1971 after performing for more than three decades.

Sources

 Grove Music Online, Noël Goodwin, May 2008.

External links
Obituary from Deutsche Presse-Agentur
Biography from Cantabile-Subito.de

1915 births
2005 deaths
Musicians from Cologne
20th-century German male opera singers
German operatic baritones